The Rupal River is an east–west glacial stream rising from the meltwater of the Rupal Glacier in northern Pakistan. The stream flows through the Rupal Valley, south of Nanga Parbat, before turning northeast to the village of Tarashing. The Rupal drains into the Astore River, which eventually reaches the Indus near Jaglot.

See also
 Rupal Valley
 Rupal Glacier
 Astore Valley

External links
 Northern Pakistan - highly detailed placemarks of towns, villages, peaks, glaciers, rivers and minor tributaries in Google Earth

Rivers of Gilgit-Baltistan
Indus basin
Rivers of Pakistan